Washington Township may refer to:

 Washington Township, Arkansas (disambiguation)
 Washington Township, Alameda County, California, a former township
 Washington Township, Illinois (disambiguation)
 Washington Township, Indiana (disambiguation)
 Washington Township, Iowa (disambiguation)
 Washington Township, Kansas (disambiguation)
 Washington Township, Michigan (disambiguation)
 Washington Township, Le Sueur County, Minnesota
 Washington Township, Missouri (disambiguation)
 Washington Township, Nebraska (disambiguation)
 Washington Township, New Jersey (disambiguation)
 Washington Township, North Carolina (disambiguation)
 Washington Township, Grand Forks County, North Dakota, in Grand Forks County, North Dakota
 Washington Township, Ohio (disambiguation)
 Washington Township, Oklahoma (disambiguation)
 Washington Township, Pennsylvania (disambiguation)
 Washington Township, South Dakota (disambiguation)

See also 
 
 List of places named for George Washington
 Washington (disambiguation)

Township name disambiguation pages